Strongylophthalmyia are a genus of slender, long-legged flies, the majority of which occur in the Oriental and Australasian regions.

Species
S. albisternum Evenhuis, 2016 - Thailand.
S. angustipennis Melander, 1920
S. bifasciata Yang & Wang, 1992
S. borneensis Evenhuis, 2016 - Borneo.
S. brunneipennis (De Meijere, 1914)
S. caestus Evenhuis, 2016 - Philippines.
S. caliginosa Iwasa, 1992
S. coarctata Hendel, 1913
S. crinita Hennig, 1940
S. darlingi Evenhuis, 2016 - Sumatra.
S. dorsocentralis Papp, 2006 - Thailand.
S. federeri Evenhuis, 2016 - Philippines. Named after tennis champion Roger Federer because of its distinctive racquet-shaped male palpus.
S. freidbergi Shatalkin, 1996
S. gibbifera Shatalkin, 1993
S. hauseri Evenhuis, 2016 - Thailand, Vietnam.
S. immaculata Hennig, 1940 - Taiwan.
S. indochinensis Evenhuis, 2016 - Cambodia, Thailand, Vietnam.
S. inundans Evenhuis, 2016 - Philippines.
S. laosensis Evenhuis, 2016 - Laos.
S. lowi Evenhuis, 2016 - Malay Peninsula.
S. lutea (De Meijere, 1914)
S. macrocera Papp, 2006 - Thailand.
S. malayensis Evenhuis, 2016 - Malay Peninsula.
S. metatarsata De Meijere, 1919
S. microstyla Shatalkin, 1996 - Philippines.
S. nigricoxa (De Meijere, 1914)
S. nigripalpis Evenhuis, 2016 - Malay Peninsula.
S. oxybeles Evenhuis, 2016 - Sumatra.
S. palpalis Papp, 2006 - Thailand.
S. pappi Evenhuis, 2016 - Thailand.
S. pectinigera Shatalkin, 1996
S. pengellyi Barber, 2007 - Canada, United States.
S. phillindablank Evenhuis, 2016 - Yunnan (China).
S. pictipes Frey, 1935
S. polita (De Meijere, 1914)
S. punctata Hennig, 1940 - Taiwan.
S. sichuanica Evenhuis, 2016 - Sichuan (China).
S. spinosa Frey, 1956 - Northern Burma.
S. sumatrana Evenhuis, 2016 - Sumatra.
S. thaii Papp, 2006 - Thailand.
S. thailandica Evenhuis, 2016 - Thailand.
S. ustulata (Zetterstedt, 1844) - Europe.
S. verrucifera Shatalkin, 1996

References 

Nerioidea
Articles containing video clips
Nerioidea genera